Madhu Gupta is an Indian doctor and politician from the state of Uttar Pradesh. She was member of Uttar Pradesh Legislative Council.

Sources
http://www.business-standard.com/article/economy-policy/i-am-true-challenger-to-prime-minister-madhu-gupta-104043001012_1.html
https://www.timesofindia.com/city/lucknow/Doctored-support-for-Madhu-Gupta/articleshow/659480.cms

Indian gynaecologists
Members of the Uttar Pradesh Legislative Assembly
Medical doctors from Uttar Pradesh
Living people
Women in Uttar Pradesh politics
Year of birth missing (living people)